Mez Breeze is an Australian-based artist and practitioner of net.art, working primarily with code poetry, electronic literature, mezangelle, and digital games. Born Mary-Anne Breeze, she uses a number of avatar nicknames, including Mez and Netwurker. She received degrees in both Applied Social Science [Psychology] at Charles Sturt University in Bathurst, Australia in 1991 and Creative Arts at the University of Wollongong in Australia in 2001. In 1994, Breeze received a diploma in Fine Arts at the Illawarra Institute of Technology, Arts and Media Campus in Australia. As of May 2014, Mez is the only Interactive Writer and Artist who is a non-USA citizen to have her comprehensive career archive (called "The Mez Breeze Papers") housed at Duke University, through their David M. Rubenstein Rare Book & Manuscript Library.

Work
 
Breeze developed, and continues to write in, the hybrid language mezangelle. Her unorthodox use of language demonstrates the ubiquity of digitisation and the intersections of the digital and the real that are increasingly common in 21st century life. As well as creating static literary texts using mezangelle, Breeze also creates multi-disciplinary multimedia works online, and participates in online happenings that blur the lines between on- and off-line behaviour.

Code poetry

Mezangelle is a type of poetry Breeze developed in the 1990s using Internet text language found in ASCII codes, online games, and other forms of Internet communication. For example, Breeze titled her 2022 work "[Por]TrAIts" where the capitalization of AI represents the subject of the book (a collaboration between a human and an AI writer).  "Mezangelle" refers both to the works themselves and the hybrid language in which they are composed—codeworks of this sort "playfully utilize programming terminology and syntax" alongside "human-only" or so-called natural language, creating a creolised language that combines human language and code. In these works, the primary message is semantically overcoded in such a way that multiple different readings are made possible. For example, the word 'mezangelle' itself is sometimes written as 'm[ez]ang.elle', which itself demonstrates the ways in which punctuation and non-alphabetical symbols (in this case the period and square brackets) disrupt and erupt through the human readable language. The word "mezangelle", itself a neologism, is fractured into multiple fragments that may allude to the words '"Mez", "ez" (easy), "mangle", "angle", "angel", and "elle", along with many possible others. This hybridisation of human-only and digital languages demonstrates both the reliance of human language upon connotation and context, and the inclusion of code in everyday digital communications.
Breeze also creates games in which texts in mezangelle are combined with images and sound. These works are often fragmentary or chaotic, as they rely both upon the polysemic nature of mezangelle and the inherent possibilities of computer programming for the display of dynamic audiovisual elements.

Online interventions
Breeze also explores and exploits environments that involve online socialisations or encounters. Such encounters involve the modification of online gaming environments, such as World of Warcraft, EVE Online, and social networking and alternate gaming software. As a member of the online group Third Faction, Breeze has been involved in a number of in-game projects within World of Warcraft, with the aim of disrupting and challenging the combative structure of the game. In this way, Breeze challenges the assumed binary division between the online environment and the real world, and acts to subvert the factionalised “confrontational player-vs-player interaction” that the game world tries to enforce. Breeze's use of multiple avatars for her digital works further emphasises the breakdown of the division between digital and real selves.

List of works
V[R]erses in the New River (Fall 2020). Work is described as a microstory in virtual reality where text nodes are embedded in a three dimensional form, with a sound loop in the background.  Users can control the sequence or leave in an autopilot mode.
<? echo [THE_SIGNIFIER] ?> (2002) Reviewed in I love E-Poetry April 10, 2012
_the data][h!][bleeding texts_ (2001) 
internal damage report and Fleshis.tics in Cauldron & Net, Volume 2 (1999) Reviewed in I love E-Poetry October 14, 2012

Exhibitions
 Wollongong World Women Online, 1995
 ISEA, 1997 Chicago USA
 ARS Electronica, 1997
 The Metropolitan Museum, Tokyo Japan 1999
 SIGGRAPH, 1999 & 2000
 _Under_Score_, The Brooklyn Academy of Music, USA 2001
 +playengines+, Melbourne Australia 2003
 p0es1s, Berlin Germany 2004
 Arte Nuevo InteractivA, Yucatán Mexico 2005
 Radical Software, Turin Italy, 2006
 DIWO, the HTTP Gallery London, 2007
 Y O U . O W N . M E. N O W . U N T I L . Y O U . F O R G E T . A B O U T . M E. Museum of Modern Art Ljubljana 2008
 New Media Scotland, 2008
 The Laguna Art Museum California and Alternator Gallery Canada, 2009
Federation Square Melbourne, 2010
 Transmediale Berlin, 2011
 [Por]TrAIts: #AI Characters + Their Microstories [Book 1]’ (2022). Featured in the Future of Text Symposium, London, September 28, 2022.
 International Digital Media and Art Association’s  2022 Weird Media Exhibition, 2022 (Dayforth)

Awards
 VIF Prize, Germany (2001)
 Electronic Literature Organisation Fiction Award Finalist for "the data][h!][bleeding texts" (2001)
 JavaArtist of the Year, Austria (2001)
 Newcastle Digital Poetry Prize, Australia (2002)
 Site Specific Index Page Competition, Italy (2006)
 Burton Wonderland Gallery Winner - judged by Tim Burton, Australia (2010)
 Transmediale Vilèm Flusser Award Nominee, Germany  (2011)
 Western Australian Premier's Book Awards Finalist: “Digital Narrative” Category for “#PRISOM” (2014)
 BBC Writersroom/The Space Digital Theatre Competition Finalist (2014)  
 Thiel Grant Award for Online Writing Finalist (2015) 
 Shortlisted in the “Games Development” Category of the MCV Pacific Women In Games List, which profiles the:  “…most influential women across all facets of the Australian and New Zealand Games Industries.” (2015) 
 Tumblr International Prize (2015)
 The Space's “Open Call” Commission for “Pluto” (2015)
Queensland Literary Awards: QUT Digital Literature Award for "V[R]ignettes" (2019)
 Woollahra Digital Literary Awards 2020 Readers’ Choice Award: Mez Breeze, Perpetual Nomads

Publications 
 Human Readable Messages_[Mezangelle 2003–2011] (2012).

See also

List of electronic literature authors, critics, and works
Digital poetry
E-book#History
Electronic literature
Hypertext fiction
Interactive fiction
Literatronica
Virtual reality
Digital art
Artificial intelligence art

References

Further reading
 Evans, Sally (2011). "'The Anti-Logos Weapon': Excesses of Meaning and Subjectivity in Mezangelle Poetry". Cordite 36.
 Hayles, N. Katherine (2002). "Deeper into the Machine: Learning to Speak Digital." Computers and Composition 19.
 Memmott, Talan (2001) "E_RUPTURE://Codework"."Serration in Electronic Literature." American Book Review 22(6).
 Raley, Rita (2002) "Interferences: [Net.Writing] and the Practice of Codework." Electronic Book Review.
 Sondheim, Alan (2001). "Introduction: Codeworks." American Book Review 22(6).

Net.artists
Living people
Year of birth missing (living people)
Australian activists
Australian women activists
Australian writers
Australian women writers
University of Wollongong alumni
Charles Sturt University alumni
New media artists
Electronic literature writers